You Can't Have Everything is a 1937 Fox musical film directed by Norman Taurog and produced by Darryl F. Zanuck. The film stars Alice Faye and Don Ameche, and was the film debut for Gypsy Rose Lee credited as Louise Hovick  part of her birth name.

Plot
Judith Poe Wells (Alice Faye) is a would-be playwright who has almost no money. As a result of ordering a meal in a restaurant where she cannot afford to pay, she meets George Macrae (Don Ameche), a musical writer with a lot of power. He offers her play North Winds to producer Sam Woods. He knows it isn't any good, but he has fallen in love with her and does it to win her over.

Cast
 Alice Faye – Judith Poe Wells
 Don Ameche – George Macrae
 Al Ritz – Al Ritz
 Jimmy Ritz – Jimmy Ritz
 Harry Ritz – Harry Ritz
 Charles Winninger – Sam Gordon
 Gypsy Rose Lee – Lulu Riley
 Arthur Treacher – Bevins
 Tony Martin – Bobby Walker
 David Rubinoff – Rubinoff and His Violin
 Tip, Tap and Toe

Soundtrack
You Can't Have Everything
Sung by Alice Faye; reprised by The Ritz Brothers, Composer: M. Gordon, H. Revel
Chopsticks
Performed by The Ritz Brothers
Danse Rubinoff
Instrumental, written and played by David Rubinoff
Long Underwear
Sung and danced by The Ritz Brothers and chorus
The Loveliness of You
Sung by Tony Martin
Afraid to Dream
Sung by Don Ameche; reprised by Alice Faye, Tony Martin, chorus
Please Pardon Us - We're in Love
Sung by Alice Faye; reprised by her, Don Ameche, Charles Winninger, The Ritz Brothers
Rhythm on the Radio
Danced by "Tip, Tap and Toe"
North Pole Sketch
Performed by The Ritz Brothers, Tony Martin, others

Other releases
Doris Day recorded the title track "You Can't Have Everything" by M. Gordon, H. Revel in 1960, along with "A Hundred Years From Today" by	J. Young, N. Washington, V. Young, and "What Every Girl Should Know" by	R. Wells, D. Holt and "Mood Indigo" by D. Ellington, I. Mills, A. Bigard

External links
 
 
 
 
 

1937 films
Films directed by Norman Taurog
American black-and-white films
1930s English-language films
20th Century Fox films
1937 musical films
American musical films
1930s American films